Daniel Patterson may refer to:
 Daniel Patterson (naval officer) (1786–1839), officer in the United States Navy
 Daniel Patterson (chef) (fl. 1980s–2020s), American chef, restaurateur, and food writer
 Daniel Patterson (volleyball) (born 1947), American former volleyball player
 Daniel J. Patterson (1857–?), American architect
 Dan Patterson (born 1960), British television producer and writer
 Daniel Patterson (politician) (born 1962), member of the Arizona House of Representatives
 Daniel Patterson (fl. 1850s–1870s), dentist and second husband of Mary Baker Eddy

See also
Daniel Paterson (1739–1825), British Army officer and cartographer